Simon Townsend's Wonder World! was an Australian children's television show that aired on Network Ten from 1979 until 1987. It was created and hosted by journalist Simon Townsend. In 1993, the show was relaunched on the Nine network as Wonder World!, hosted by Pascall Fox.p7

Format
Each episode of Simon Townsend's Wonder World! featured an introduction by Townsend as the studio host, accompanied by his pet and companion bloodhound Woodrow (Woodrow died in 1986 and was replaced at first with a sulphur-crested cockatoo and then with a baby Labrador retriever. A competition was run amongst the viewers to name the new puppy and as Townsend had recently won a Logie award, the puppy was named Logie). Townsend would then present four individual magazine-style stories, each presented by a different reporter.

The stories covered many subjects - sometimes serious, sometimes funny, always entertaining. The production team included an Executive Producer (for most of the show's run, this was Harvey Shore), plus as Associate Producer, a Production Assistant, two researchers, two cinematographers, two sound recordists, four reporters and four editors. This team produced the equivalent of one average feature film every week – about eighty minutes of screen time - shot on 16mm reversal film. Stories were not scripted; each one relying upon the researcher's report, the producer's briefing, and the ingenuity of the reporter and the two-person crew.

Every show also contained a viewer segment, and a music segment – often produced by the program itself. For instance Simon Townsend's Wonder World! made the first ever music video to feature Australian band INXS. During the course of the series, Townsend and his reporters travelled all over Australia and to many and varied locations in America, the UK, Europe, India, Asia, New Zealand, Fiji, The Philippines, and other places in the Pacific region. But Simon Townsend always insisted that Wonder World stories should generally be timeless and placeless, so - although produced in Sydney - they would always appeal to “Tom in Perth”.

Simon Townsend would end every show with the same signature farewell – "And remember, the world really is wonderful!"

History
The program was conceived by Townsend in the early 1970s and was designed to be a fast-moving daily dose of informed entertainment for children, as well as be suitable for and attractive to older teens and adults.

Both the Nine and the Seven Networks helped Townsend make pilots for his concept, but neither network bought the series. However, in 1979 when the Australian Broadcasting Tribunal introduced a compulsory 'C' classification (making it a requirement for networks to broadcast only 'C' classified shows between 4pm and 5pm weekdays), Townsend saw the potential and offered the Ten Network, which was searching for a suitable children's program at the time, the opportunity to produce his show.

The first episode of Simon Townsend's Wonder World! went to air on 3 September 1979. At first the show was telecast only in the East Coast capital cities of Sydney, Melbourne and Brisbane. But in early 1980, after Harvey Shore joined the show as Executive Producer and used his extensive media contacts and movie publicity experience to generate regular publicity and create massive public awareness of the show among all network States, the ratings shot up and other capital cities and regional stations began signing up for the show.

By the end of 1980 the show was screening in every TV broadcast region throughout Australia. Soon it became the top-rating program on the Ten Network outside prime time – and sometimes its ratings were better than prime-time programs. For many years the Ten Network ran two episodes of Simon Townsend's Wonder World every weekday because of its ratings power – a repeat show at 4pm followed by a new show at 4.30pm.

After more than 2,000 episodes, the show ended in 1987.

Wonder World! 
Six years later, in 1993, the Nine Network decided to re-launch Simon's show with a new host Pascall Fox. The title was shortened to Wonder World!, and again ran every weekday afternoon on Nine for the next three years. It also used the same theme music as the original Simon Townsend's Wonder World! This version was sung by James Morley. At the time, Morley was the Bass Player for "The Angels". Simon Townsend is still the rights holder to the theme music and the program format.

Theme music

Simon Townsend was originally keen to use the 1976 Bill Danoff song Afternoon Delight as the theme song for his afternoon TV show. In fact, this song was used as the opener when the show first went to air. However, when the meaning of the lyrics was pointed out to him, Townsend decided to commission a new and original theme song clearly linked to the eponymous host of the show.

As a consequence, Townsend hired Australian songwriter/producer Chris Pelcer to write a theme song for Simon Townsend's Wonder World!. John St Peeters sang this original theme. It was arranged and produced by Mike Harvey at EMI Studios Sydney in 1979, and released as a single by RCA that same year. It was simply titled "Wonder World!" on the record sleeve. In 1983, Simon decided to re-record this theme song. John St Peeters was by then working in the US, and unavailable; so Simon cast around for a new voice and eventually settled on up-and-coming female singer, Naomi Louise Warne, who went on to achieve international fame as a blues singer, composer and instrumentalist. Warne's voice and style just edged out Edith Bliss, a reporter on Simon Townsend's Wonder World! who had released her own songs, possessed a good voice, and was keen to get the gig. Naomi Warne's version of the theme was recorded in 1983 and again released on a record, and was used on the TV show every weekday afternoon for one season, then a new, upbeat re-recording by John St Peeters was used until Simon's show ended in 1987.

Awards and accolades
Simon Townsend's Wonder World! won many awards, including five LOGIE Awards, a TV Star Award and many other trophies, certificates of commendation and popularity prizes. In 1983, Australian Prime Minister Bob Hawke presented Simon Townsend with a special – Prime Minister's Award trophy, commemorating the milestone of broadcasting the One Thousandth Episode of Simon Townsend's Wonder World! (as recorded in TV Week, issue of 9 June 1983.) The show still remains the highest rating children's program in Australian TV history.

Townsend was always a great supporter of new Australian talents. Simon's company Townsend Entertainments gave many people their first opportunity to prove themselves in the entertainment business and was the first production company in Australia to give a woman, Bronwyn Nicholas, a full-time position as a cinematographer. Another Wonder World! cinematographer Andrew Lesnie went on to win an Academy Award for his film work. Many others who later became well known in the film and TV industry got their first break thanks to Simon Townsend's Wonder World!. The program's alumni include: Jonathan Coleman, who became a huge star in both Australia and UK, Angela Catterns, who became a radio star, and Edith Bliss, who starred in both advertising and music. Philip Tanner and Maurice Parker became top producers, while Tanner and Brett Clements later made board games after being inspired by a Wonder World! story on Crown & Andrews. Researcher Kristine Wyld went on to write and produce many TV drama series, and researcher Fiona Baker created many hit TV shows (like RPA) for the Nine Network and later for other TV networks, after getting her first job as a researcher on Wonder World! straight out of university.

Reporters
The star reporters on Simon Townsend's Wonder World!, during its seven years on air, included:

 Jonathan Coleman
 Angela Catterns
 Hugh Piper
 Sandy Mauger
 Edith Bliss
 Sheridan Jobbins
 Alita Fahey
 Maurice Parker
 Phillip Tanner
 Hugh Munro
 Brett Clements
 Wednesday Kennedy
 Adam Bowen
 Carolyn Mee
 Malinda Rutter

Wonder World!
In 1992, two of Simon Townsend's former reporters Phillip Tanner and Brett Clements purchased a license from Simon to produce a new version of Simon Townsend's Wonder World and sold the new version to the Nine Network, which re-launched the show. The successor's new name was shortened to Wonder World!. The "Wonder World!" theme song written for the show at Simon Townsend's request by Australian songwriter/producer Chris Pelcer, remained the show's theme until its final episode.

Harvey Shore was hired to train new reporters and produce the show once again, this time for the Nine Network.
The hosts and reporters of this new series were:

 Pascall Fox (famous for her brightly coloured hair, often red or orange. She was later one of the presenters of the Australian version of Ground Force in the early 2000s, and on the Australian version of the show Your Life on the Lawn 2003–2004.)
 Jodie Young (who went on to star in Sex/Life, and in 1998 posed nude for Australian Playboy)
 Nick Penn
 Tony Johnston (who went on to produce many TV shows and to work overseas.)

Later reporters included:
 Catriona Rowntree (who became a major star of the Nine Network in Getaway and other series.)
 Dave Kelly (who became a film editor and producer)
 Sonia Kruger (who became a star of the Seven network)

Appearances on the show:
 Bill Bovill was "Today's Poet" and later referred to it on his blog.

Nine's Wonder World! began production in 1993, and rated well in its three-year run.

See also
 List of Australian television series

References

External links
Simon Townsend's Wonder World at the National Film and Sound Archive
Simon Townsend's Journalism Website

Australian children's television series
Network 10 original programming
Nine Network original programming
1979 Australian television series debuts
1986 Australian television series endings
1993 Australian television series debuts
1995 Australian television series endings